The Black Knight is the alias of several fictional characters appearing in American comic books published by Marvel Comics.

The first is a medieval knight created by writer Stan Lee and artist Joe Maneely, who made his first appearance in Black Knight #1 (May 1955), during the Silver Age of Comics, when Marvel Comics was previously known as Atlas Comics. The second is a supervillain descendant of the original, created by Lee and artist and co-plotter Dick Ayers, who first appeared in Tales to Astonish #52 (Feb. 1964). The third, created by writer Roy Thomas, production editor John Verpoorten, and artist George Tuska, is the villain's nephew, a superhero and a member of the superhero team the Avengers, who first appeared in The Avengers #47 (Dec. 1967). A fourth Black Knight with no revealed genetic connection debuted in The Black Panther #3 (June 2005), created by writer Reginald Hudlin and penciler John Romita Jr.

Dane Whitman appears in the live-action Marvel Cinematic Universe film Eternals (2021), portrayed by Kit Harington.

Publication history 
Marvel Comics' first Black Knight, Sir Percy of Scandia, first appeared in the medieval-adventure series Black Knight #1–5 (cover-dated May 1955–April 1956) from Atlas Comics, the 1950s precursor to Marvel Comics.

Sir Percy's descendant, Professor Nathan Garrett, debuted as the modern-day supervillain Black Knight in Tales to Astonish #52 (Feb. 1964). This villainous Black Knight appeared in The Avengers #6, #14–15 (July 1964, March–April 1965), and in the feature "Iron Man" in Tales of Suspense #73 (Jan. 1966), in which he was mortally wounded.

Dane Whitman, Garrett's nephew, made his first appearance in The Avengers #47 (Dec. 1967) and became a heroic version of the Black Knight in the subsequent issue. Whitman sporadically appeared with the Avengers until becoming a core member, regularly appearing in #252–300 (1985–1989) and #329–375 (1991–1994).

The Gatherers storyline running through The Avengers #343–375 (1992–1994) placed the spotlight on the Black Knight, as the book's focus turned toward his tumultuous relationship with the Eternal Sersi and mysterious connection to the other-dimensional villain Proctor. Whitman later starred in Malibu Comics' UltraForce #8–10 (1995) and UltraForce vol. 2 #1–12 (1995–1996), leading a new team of heroes on a parallel world. Returning to the Marvel Universe proper, Whitman appeared in Heroes for Hire #1–16 (1997–1998) and, later, Captain Britain and MI13 #1–15 (2008–2009). The Black Knight has yet to return to the Avengers, the team with which the character is most closely associated. In 2015, as part of All-New All-Different, a solo series was launched featuring Dane Whitman; however, it was canceled after 5 issues due to low sales.

Whitman and Sir Percy also starred in the limited series Black Knight #1–4 (June–Sept. 1990), written by Roy and Dann Thomas and drawn by successive pencillers Tony DeZuniga and Rich Buckler. In 1995, Percy had a cameo in Namor #60 as part of the Atlantis Rising story. Whitman and Sersi then headlined the one-shot Black Knight: Exodus (Dec. 1996), written by Ben Raab and illustrated by Jimmy Cheung and Andy Lanning. Another Black Knight one-shot starring Sir Percy, written by Thomas and illustrated by Tom Grummett and Scott Hanna, was published as Mystic Arcana: Black Knight #1 (Sept. 2007), the second of four Mystic Arcana one-shot issues.

Fictional character biographies

Sir Percy of Scandia 
The original Black Knight is Sir Percy of Scandia, a 6th-century knight who serves at the court of King Arthur as his greatest warrior. Recruited by the wizard Merlin, Percy adopts a double identity, and pretends to be very incompetent until changing into the persona of the Black Knight. As the Black Knight, Percy wields the Ebony Blade, which Merlin forged from a meteorite. A constant foe of the evil knight Mordred the Evil (Arthur's traitorous nephew), Percy is eventually killed by him during the fall of Camelot when stabbed from behind with an enchanted blade – although Mordred then dies himself of wounds inflicted by Arthur. Merlin ensures that Percy's spirit will live on by casting a spell that will revive his ghost if Mordred should ever return. Percy's spirit has appeared several times to counsel his descendant, Dane Whitman.

Nathan Garrett 
Biologist Professor Nathan Garrett is the direct descendant of Sir Percy (although it has been implied Percy's nephew Raston inherited the blade), and found Sir Percy's tomb and the Ebony Blade. Garrett's evil tendencies make him unworthy of wielding the sword, and Sir Percy’s ghost shuns him. An embittered Garrett then devises an arsenal of medieval weapons that employ modern technology and has genetic engineers create a winged horse that he names Aragorn. Calling himself the Black Knight, Garrett embarks on a life of crime to spite his ancestor. After a battle with the hero Giant-Man Garrett joins the supervillain team the Masters of Evil at the request of master villain Baron Zemo and like the others spreads Adhesive X over the city, but is first defeated by Thor. After two unsuccessful battles with the Avengers, the second time of which he was broken out of jail by the Enchantress, he battled Iron Man due to Doctor Doom's mind-control machine (which made supervillains attack Mister Fantastic's and the Invisible Woman's wedding, which the affected villains subsequently forget due to a machine created by Mister Fantastic). Garrett is mortally wounded falling from his winged horse while trying to kill Iron Man. A dying Garrett reveals his secret identity to his nephew, Dane Whitman, and repents for his life of crime. Whitman then adopts the identity of the Black Knight himself.

Dane Whitman 
Dane Whitman is the Black Knight who has been a longtime member of the Avengers as well as a member of the Defenders, Ultraforce, Heroes for Hire, and MI: 13. Using his uncle's notes, Whitman wielded the same equipment and created his own Aragorn.

Augustine du Lac 
A Vatican Black Knight named Augustine du Lac received the Ebony Blade after Vatican agents retrieved it from an Iraqi vampire nest. In addition, Augustine created his own Aragorn. He is a member of a team of supervillains that invades the African nation of Wakanda. A devout Catholic, du Lac hopes to convert the populace to Catholicism. Black Panther takes the Ebony Blade and defeats him. Augustine's Aragorn was later captured by Alyosha Kravinoff and killed for food.

Female Black Knight 
A teenage female Black Knight later appears in the Vengeance limited series as a member of the Young Masters. Like Garrett, this incarnation is a villain, and appears to possess the Ebony Blade. How she came into possession of the sword and what happened to Augustine has yet to be revealed. She was with the Young Masters when they were at an abandoned HYDRA base in Pennsylvania. While inspecting Bullseye's corpse, they were attacked by Lady Bullseye. Later targeting Doctor Octopus for "execution", the Young Masters found themselves battling the Sinister Six while being assisted by the Teen Brigade, with Black Knight being assisted in taking down Sandman by Teen Brigade member Ultimate Nullifier. While visiting a nightclub, Black Knight encountered Ultimate Nullifier at the time when the Young Masters plotted to recruit a reborn Loki to their side. In the morning, Black Knight showed Ultimate Nullifier a letter that spurred the Young Masters on their quest to kill older villains along with a CIA file discussing genocide on Russian prisoners carried out by Red Skull in World War II Poland. Informing Ultimate Nullifier that she was going to leave the Young Masters and had plans that did not involve evil, she left the Young Masters' base leaving behind the CIA file for Nullifier.

Black Knight was later seen with the Young Masters where they are seen as members of the Shadow Council's Masters of Evil, which is led by Baron Helmut Zemo following Max Fury's death.

The Black Knight lineage 
Nathan Garrett and Dane Whitman are part of a lineage of Black Knights stretching back to the 6th century. In New Excalibur #10, the first part of the "Last Day of Camelot" storyline, it is revealed that Dane has turned Garrett Castle into a Black Knight museum with various exhibits on the Black Knights, including the body of Sir Percy. There is a long line of paintings of the Knights including, according to the curator, "Sir Ralston[sic] and Sir Eobar or lesser known knights like Sir William and Sir Henry." These Black Knights are:

 Sir Raston ("Ralston" appears only in New Excalibur #10) – Sir Percy's nephew, who became the Black Knight after him. He lived in the Dark Ages, but was recruited into the Anachronauts by Kang the Conqueror and travelled through time.
 Sir Eobar of Garrington – He was the Black Knight during the Crusades.
 Sir William – He is depicted fighting in the trenches of World War I.
 Sir Henry – He is depicted as a swashbuckling figure.

Later in "The Last Days of Camelot", Sir Percy reveals to Dane that he was not the first Black Knight and that eight knights had carried the Ebony Blade before him, the last being King Arthur's cousin Sir Reginald. Each one had been driven mad by the sword and had to be killed until it was decided there were only three people who could take the sword, but King Arthur and Merlin were needed in other capacities, so the "burden" fell to Sir Percy who accepted despite knowing the risks.

The apparent "Last Knight" is Ernst Wythim, a member of the lineage from around 2600 AD.

Other versions

Earth X 
In the Earth X series, Ahura – the son of Black Bolt and Medusa – becomes the Black Knight. Dane Whitman was turned to stone by the Grey Gargoyle.

Marvel Zombies 

Dane becomes one of the dozens of super-powered zombies that are laying siege to the castle of Doctor Doom. The zombies have detected delicious humans hiding inside, all of whom ultimately escape.

Ultimate Marvel 
In the Ultimate Marvel universe, the Black Knight (real name Alex) is a member of the would-be superhero team the Defenders. He is long-haired, bearded, and out-of-shape, with a piece of armor, and resembles a LARPer. He later shows up in Ultimate Comics: New Ultimates, alongside the super-powered Defenders from a mysterious source.

The Dane Whitman version of Black Knight appears in the pages of Ultimate Comics: Ultimates as a member of an Ultimates team that preceded the current one by almost a decade. This Black Knight was highly unstable and was kept from officially joining the team until he stabilized. This never came to pass as the team bungled a mission and the project was shut down immediately after.

Ebony Blade

History 
The Ebony Blade was created by comic book writer Stan Lee in Black Knight Comics #1, published under Atlas Comics in 1955. Its history was later revealed in Marvel Super-Heroes #17 (Nov 1968), written by Roy Thomas. The blade was shown to have been carved from a meteor and enchanted by the wizard Merlin for Sir Percy of Scandia, the first Black Knight. Due to all the blood that Sir Percy shed with the blade, it acquired a curse. The sword passed down through the generations until it came to Sir Percy's descendant Dane Whitman. Dane used the blade for many years. It passed briefly to Valkyrie when Dane's body was turned to stone and his soul sent back in time to the 13th century, but it was soon returned to him. Due to the curse, Dane eventually gave up the Ebony Blade by driving it deep into the same meteor that it was forged from, now residing in his castle. Only another deemed worthy would be able to withdraw it.

Sean Dolan, Dane's ex-squire, was able to draw the blade during an attack on Whitman's castle. This transformed Dolan into Bloodwraith. Dolan fought with the curse and was able to give up the sword for a brief time. During this time, it was trapped in the Negative Zone barrier outside of Attilan. In the meantime, a second Ebony Blade had been brought into this dimension by Proctor, an alternate reality version of Dane. When Proctor was killed, his blade was taken into Avengers custody.

Dolan was drawn to this second Blade, and once again became Bloodwraith. Crystal retrieved the original Blade, and The Vision threatened to destroy it if Bloodwraith did not surrender. Bloodwraith tossed the alternate Blade aside and reclaimed his own. Crystal picked up the second Blade and said it would be important to the future of the Inhumans. Bloodwraith was last known to have the Blade in his possession in Slorenia, where he was trapped by the Scarlet Witch.

At some point Dracula replaced Dane Whitman's blade with a fake one (see below), and the real Blade came to be in Iraq and was secured by the Vatican after it was found by Opus Dei in a purging of a vampire nest. The Vatican sent a new Black Knight assassin (Augustine du Lac) to kill Black Panther, who took it from the Knight for his own uses. Black Panther used the blade in several battles, including the Skrull invasion.

Upon learning the blade was fake for a second time, Dane Whitman retrieved the real blade from Black Panther's Wakandan nation where he was presented it by Queen Ororo T'Challa.

During War of the Realms event, when Malekith attacked Black Knight, Union Jack, and Spitfire, he acquired the Ebony Blade and was ready to kill them until the War Avengers arrived.

It comes to light in King in Black that the wizard Merlin had lied about how a wielder uses the cursed sword. Knull, primordial dark god of all symbiotes, revealed it only gives its true power to those who prove to be the most "baneful" and hate-filled of individuals, not those who are pure in body and mind; it takes one who is able to come to grips with their own faults and push on despite them to utilize what the evil deity described as World Ender.

The sword also gives its users a state of resurrective immortality wherein if the wielder were to fall in battle, a blood offering of sorts can be used to restore them to life.

Powers and abilities 
The Ebony Blade is a powerful enchanted weapon. It is said to be indestructible, and only the extremely powerful Iron Ogre, a magic creature, could split it in half. The blade has many mystical or quasi-mystical capabilities, including the ability to:
 shear through any physical substance with the exception of other enchanted weapons and extremely strong metals like adamantium.
 cleaves mystical barriers
 deflect energy when angled correctly
 absorb all forms of energy, including the Promethean Flame
 grants retroactive immortality
 manifests shadowed armor in a similar manner to a Klyntar
 discharges force of its own
 can absorb souls to make itself stronger
 bypass intangibility
 wispy armor enables wielders to fly
 protection from mysticism
 bestows an incredible healing factor

Dane Whitman discovered most of these abilities through scientific testing of the Blade. Additionally, the Blade bonds to its wielder in such a way that the wielder can summon it back to himself or herself using a mystical ceremony if it is ever lost, even if it is in a different time period.  The Blade cannot be used against its owner, as seen when Caden Tar tries to use it to kill Dane Whitman, but cannot pierce his skin. The Blade formerly rendered its wielder invulnerable to everything except another weapon carved from the same meteor, such as the Ebony Dagger.

Other notable wielders of the Blade include Whitman's ancestors Sir Percy of Scandia, Eobar Garrington, Valkyrie, and Ares.

Curses and influences 
The Ebony Blade was afflicted with a blood curse due to all the blood the original Black Knight had spilled. Dane Whitman eventually purged the Blade of its curse at Doctor Strange's behest by plunging it into the Brazier of Truth while Strange bathed them both in magic fire. The curse returned, however, when the Sub-Mariner used it to kill his wife Marrina. The curse seems to affect different people in different ways. It turned Dane into a statue, it amplified Proctor's gann'josin-based powers, and it granted Sean Dolan great physical powers as Bloodwraith.

The Blade was sometimes known to subtly compel Dane to do things or go places that were tied to its previous wielders, as well. It was revealed by the symbiote god Knull that its power relies on the curse. As it thrives on the negative proclivities of flawed and imperfect wielders to maximize on its inherent power. Something that only the unworthy can utilize as its edge dulls when wielded by a chivalrous soul.

Fake Ebony Blade 
On occasion, the Ebony Blade appears in two separate comic series simultaneously, most notably in 2006 when it was in use by Dane Whitman (Black Knight) in the New Excalibur series whilst it was in use in a Black Panther ongoing by another Black Knight and subsequently Black Panther.

In a 2006 interview, when addressing a question about the confusion of the Ebony Blades appearing in two comics, Marvel Comics' editor Nick Lowe had this response:

At the end of those issues no full explanation was given. Whitman was shown to have sensed that his Ebony Blade was not the real one and left to find the original, then being used by Black Panther. Though both Captain Britain and Pete Wisdom knew the location of the real blade, Whitman had somehow forgotten it was fake during his next comic appearance in Captain Britain and MI-13 #1.

Writer Paul Cornell revealed a full explanation within the Captain Britain series, having Dracula replace Dane Whitman's blade with a fake version at some point between The Avengers vol. 3 #37 and New Excalibur #10. This fake blade has a vampire fang within it, which has shown some signs of sentience as people have talked to the blade directly. This mystical sentience has acted in the same fashion as the original's curse; convincingly enough to fool Whitman. Even after Whitman first realized it was fake in New Excalibur, it affected his memories so that he forgot, meaning he thought he held the real one by the time of Captain Britain and MI-13.

Upon learning that the blade was fake for the second time in #7 of that series, Whitman retrieved the real blade from Black Panther's Wakandan nation where he was presented it by Queen Ororo T'Challa.

In other media

Television 
 The Nathan Garrett incarnation of the Black Knight appears in The Marvel Super Heroes. This version is a member of Baron Heinrich Zemo's Masters of Evil, though he has also appeared on his own.
 The Sir Percy incarnation of the Black Knight appears in the Spider-Man and His Amazing Friends episode "Knights & Demons", voiced by Vic Perrin. Dane Whitman was also meant to appear, but was rejected to avoid confusion.
 The Augustine du Lac incarnation of the Black Knight appears in Black Panther, voiced by JB Blanc.
 The Nathan Garrett incarnation of the Black Knight appears in Iron Man: Armored Adventures, voiced by Alistair Abell. This version is a member of the Maggia and personal enforcer to Count Nefaria.
 The Dane Whitman incarnation of the Black Knight makes a non-speaking cameo appearance in The Avengers: Earth's Mightiest Heroes episode "Come the Conqueror".

Film 
Dane Whitman appeared in Eternals (2021), portrayed by Kit Harington.

Video games 
 The Dane Whitman incarnation of the Black Knight appears as a playable character in Marvel: Avengers Alliance.
 The Nathan Garrett, Dane Whitman, and Augustine du Lac incarnations of the Black Knight appear in Lego Marvel's Avengers, with Garrett and Whitman appearing in the Masters of Evil DLC pack while Du Lac appears in the Black Panther DLC pack.
 A teenage version of Dane Whitman / Black Knight appears as a playable character in Marvel Avengers Academy, voiced by Ian Russell.
 The Dane Whitman, Sir Percy, and Nathan Garrett incarnations of the Black Knight appear as unlockable characters in Lego Marvel Super Heroes 2. Sir Percy resides in the Medieval England section of Chronopolis until Garrett and the Enchantress take over. However, Captain America, Captain Avalon, Doctor Strange, and Star-Lord defeat the villains and free Sir Percy.

References

External links 
 Black Knight at the Marvel Universe
 Black Knight at the Marvel Database Project
 Atlas Tales
 The Unofficial Handbook of Marvel Comics Creators

Arthurian characters
Arthurian comics
Fantasy comics
Fictional knights
Characters created by Stan Lee
Fictional swordfighters in comics
1955 comics debuts
Comics set in the Middle Ages
Comics characters introduced in 1955
Atlas Comics characters
Atlas Comics titles